The Ministry of Culture, Youth and Sports, Brunei Darussalam (MCYS, KKBS) is a ministry in the Government of Brunei Darussalam responsible for the policies and development of the country's national culture, youth, and sports.  It was established immediately upon Brunei's independence on 1 January 1984.  It is led by a minister, and the incumbent is Nazmi Mohamad who has held office since 7 June 2022.  The ministry is headquartered in Bandar Seri Begawan, in the Brunei-Muara District of the sultanate of Brunei Darussalam.

Organisations
The ministry oversees the following government organisations:
Brunei History Centre — responsible for the official research and dissemination on the history of Brunei;
Museums Department — manages public museums nationwide, as well as heritage and archaeological sites;
Language and Literature Bureau (DBP) — the country's language authority and operator of public libraries;
Youth and Sports Department (JBS) — oversees the development of national youth and sports, national athletes and public sports facilities;
Community Development Department (JAPEM) — mainly manages the provision of welfare to the disabled, the needy and orphans;
National Archives — the country's national archives;
Youth Development Centre (PPB) — a post-secondary institution providing basic vocational training skills;
National Service Programme (PKBN) — the country's voluntary military national service.

The Sports School, the sole sports school in the country, was formerly managed by the ministry but has since been transferred to the Ministry of Education.

Budget
In the fiscal year 2022–2023, the ministry has been allocated a budget of B$98 million, a 5.7 percent increase from the previous year.

Ministers

Notes

References

Bibliography

External links
www.KKBS.gov.bn 

Culture, Youth and Sports
Brunei
Brunei
Brunei
Ministries established in 1984
1984 establishments in Brunei